Elaine H. Koppelman Eugster (March 28, 1937 – January 11, 2019) was an American mathematician. She was the James Beall Professor of Mathematics at Goucher College.

Early life and education 
Koppelman was born on March 28, 1937, in Brooklyn, New York. She had two brothers. At the age of 16, Koppelman graduated from high school. She earned a bachelor's degree in mathematics with a minor in physics from Brooklyn College. Koppelman completed a Master of Arts and an all but dissertation in mathematics at Yale University. For two years, she conducted doctoral research on a mathematical problem before uncovering that an obscure mathematics journal in Poland had already published the solution.

Career and education 
In 1961, Koppelman was hired as a teacher at Goucher College with the contingency that she complete her thesis. She attempted to do so for 2 years before giving up. At the suggestion of her husband Hans P. Eugster, Koppelman competed a doctorate in the history of science at Johns Hopkins University in 1969. Her dissertation was titled Calculus of operations: French influence on British mathematics in the first half of the nineteenth century. Koppelman completed the dissertation with her doctoral advisor was Harry Woolf and Carl Benjamin Boyer of Brooklyn College. Koppelman was the James Beall Professor of Mathematics at Goucher College. In 1987, she earned a master's degree in electrical engineering and computer science from Johns Hopkins University. She worked as a field assistant for her husband who was a geologist which took her around the globe. After Eugster's death in 1987, Koppelman volunteered for the Peace Corps and taught data processing in Seychelles. She returned to Goucher where she retired in 2001.

Personal life 
Koppelman was married to geologist Hans P. Eugster. They resided in Maryland and purchased a home in Martha's Vineyard in 1984. Eugster died suddenly in 1987. She established the Hans Eugster Research Fund at Johns Hopkins University. Koppelman served on the board or as a volunteer and patron at Martha's Vineyard Cancer Support Group, Hospice of Martha's Vineyard, Friends of the Vineyard Haven Library, the Committee on Hunger, Martha's Vineyard Chamber Music Society, Polly Hill Arboretum, Vineyard Playhouse, and the Yard. Koppelman died on January 11, 2019. She was survived by 3 stepdaughters and 7 step-grandchildren. A memorial service was held in Martha's Vineyard Hebrew Center.

See also 

 List of women in mathematics
 Timeline of women in mathematics in the United States

References 

1937 births
2019 deaths
People from Brooklyn
Brooklyn College alumni
Yale University alumni
Goucher College faculty and staff
Johns Hopkins University alumni
20th-century American mathematicians
20th-century women mathematicians
American women mathematicians
Peace Corps volunteers
Jewish women scientists
20th-century American women scientists
21st-century American women